Train is the debut album from the American rock band Train, released in 1998. The album was self-produced for $25,000 and three singles from the album were released. The first single released, "Meet Virginia", peaked at No. 20 on the Billboard Hot 100. The second, "Free", was largely a hit on rock stations, and the third single from the album was "I Am". The album has been certified platinum by the RIAA.

Track listing

Original track listing
The original independent release, released on December 6, 1996, had a different track listing.

"I Am"
"Free"
"Homesick"
"Blind"
"Eggplant"
"Meet Virginia"
"Train"
"Rat"
"Swaying"
"Days"
"Idaho"
"Sorry For"
"The Highway" (hidden track)

Personnel
Train
 Pat Monahan – lead vocals, percussion
 Jimmy Stafford – lead guitar, mandolin, backing vocals
 Rob Hotchkiss – rhythm guitar, harmonica, backing vocals
 Charlie Colin – bass
 Scott Underwood – drums, percussion

Additional personnel
 Grandma E. Bishop – art design
 David Bryson – mixing
 Gary Cirimelli – mixing assistant
 Tommy Dougherty III – art direction
 Charlie Gillingham – piano, organ, mellotron
 Bob Ludwig – mastering
 Mike McHugh – engineer
 Curtis Mathewson – moog synthesizer, producer, melodica
 Nick DiDia – engineer
 Charles Quagliana – engineer
 Stephen Saper – authoring
 Richard Stutting – artwork, design, illustrations
 Train – producer
 Matt Wallace – producer, engineer, mixing on "If You Leave"
 Alan Yoshida – mastering
 Joel Zimmerman – art director

Charts

Certifications

References

1998 debut albums
Train (band) albums
Aware Records albums
Columbia Records albums